Sarnów may refer to the following places:
Sarnów, Łask County in Łódź Voivodeship (central Poland)
Sarnów, Poddębice County in Łódź Voivodeship (central Poland)
Sarnów, Lublin Voivodeship (east Poland)
Sarnów, Subcarpathian Voivodeship (south-east Poland)
Sarnów, Kozienice County in Masovian Voivodeship (east-central Poland)
Sarnów, Sochaczew County in Masovian Voivodeship (east-central Poland)
Sarnów, Będzin County in Silesian Voivodeship (south Poland)
Sarnów, Gliwice County in Silesian Voivodeship (south Poland)
Sarnów, Opole Voivodeship (south-west Poland)